Chaozhou Township (also spelled Chaojhou) is an urban township in western Pingtung County, Taiwan.

Name
Chaozhou is named after Chaozhou, a city in eastern Guangdong, China. According to some historians, settlers from that city landed here in 1724, and thus named this area after their hometown.

Geography
The township is located in the western side of Pingtung County at the Pingtung Plain.

Administrative divisions

The township comprises 21 villages: Baye, Chaozhou, Fuchun, Guangchun, Guanghua, Jiukuai, Lundong, Pengcheng, Penglai, Sangong, Sanhe, Sanxing, Shezi, Sichun, Silin, Tongrong, Wukui, Xingmei, Xinrong, Xinsheng and Yongchun.

Education

Language
Many inhabitants speak the Taiwanese Hokkien language. The original Chaoshan language spoken by the inhabitants has now been completely forgotten due to assimilation.

Senior high schools 
 National Chao-Chou Senior High School
 Jih Hsin Insdustrial and Commercial Vocational Senior School

Junior high schools 
 Pingtung County Chaozhou Junior High School
 Pingtung County Guangchun Junior High School

Primary schools
 Chaozhou Primary School
 Guangchun Primary School
 Silin Primary School
 Chaonan Primary School
 Chaodong Primary School
 Chaosheng Primary School
 Guanghua Primary School
 Chaohe Primary School

Tourist attractions
 Bada Forest Paradise
 Chaolin Temple
 Linhousilin Forest Park
 Museum of Traditional Theater

Notable natives
 Ang Lee, film director and screenwriter
 Chen Bao-ji, Minister of Council of Agriculture (2012-2016)

Transportation

Railway
Taiwan Railways Administration Pingtung Line
Chaozhou Station

Highway
 National Freeway 3
 Provincial Highway 88
Zhutian System Interchange

References

Townships in Pingtung County
Chaozhou